Charles Casey may refer to:

 Charles Casey (lawyer) (1895–1952), Irish lawyer and judge
 Charles P. Casey (born 1942), American organometallic chemist
 Charles Casey (American football) (born 1944), former American football player